Ropienka  (Ropenka) is a village in the administrative district of Gmina Ustrzyki Dolne, within Bieszczady County, Subcarpathian Voivodeship, in south-eastern Poland.

History

As a result of the first of Partitions of Poland (Treaty of St-Petersburg dated 5 July 1772, Ropienka (and the Galicia) was attributed to the Habsburg monarchy.

For more details, see the article Kingdom of Galicia and Lodomeria.

A post-office was opened in 1890, in the Lisko district.

References

Ropienka